Rajeev Kumar may refer to:

 Rajeev Kumar (police officer), former Director General of Police of the state of Jharkhand
 Rajeev Kumar (activist), professor at the Indian Institute of Technology, Kharagpur
 Rajeev Kumar (politician), Indian politician
 Rajeev Kumar (Social & Political Worker), Garhpura Namak Satyagraha Gaurav Yatra Samiti , Begusarai, Bihar

See also
 Rajiv Kumar (disambiguation)